The Seattle Municipal Street Railway was a city-owned streetcar network that served the city of Seattle, Washington and its suburban neighborhoods from 1919 to 1941. It was a successor to the horse-drawn Seattle Street Railway established in 1884, and immediate successor to the Puget Sound Traction, Power and Light Company Seattle division.

History

Origins and consolidation

The first streetcars in Seattle were operated by Frank Osgood as the Seattle Street Railway, which ran horsecars starting from September 23, 1884. Osgood went on to convert the horsecars to electric traction as the Seattle Electric Railway and Power Company, beginning with a test on March 30, 1889 and followed by regular service the next day. By 1891, Seattle had  of street railway tracks, of which  had been built since 1889.

 
In 1898, Stone & Webster began assembling a transit system by consolidating several smaller streetcar lines, including the Seattle Electric Railway. By 1900, Stone & Webster had amalgamated 22 lines and gained a 40-year operating franchise under a new power and transport utility named the Seattle Electric Company. The system also included cable car lines on Madison Street and Yesler Way. By the end of 1900, the City Council, under public pressure, forced Seattle Electric to provide free transfers between lines, and reduced their lease to 35-years. In 1907, Stone & Webster also acquired the lease to the Everett streetcar system, and in 1912 it combined all of its transit and utility holdings in the area under a new company, the Puget Sound Traction, Power and Light Company (PSTP&L).

Municipal acquisition
The City of Seattle entered into direct competition with Seattle Electric by furnishing electricity in 1905 after completing the Seattle Municipal Light and Power Plant. In September 1918, PSTP&L agreed to sell its lines to the city, and several months of increasingly acrimonious negotiations followed.

On March 31, 1919, the city of Seattle purchased the entire Seattle division of PSTP&L's street railways but the price of the acquisition, left the transit operation with an immense debt and an immediate need to raise fares, which hurt ridership. By 1936, the city still owed half the principal on the 1918 bonds used to purchase the system, and was faced with a $4 million operating deficit. In 1939, a new transportation agency, the Seattle Transit System, was formed, which refinanced the remaining debt and began replacing equipment with "trackless trolleys" (as then known) and motor buses. The final streetcar ran on April 13, 1941.

Revival

A modern streetcar system debuted in 2007, with the introduction of the South Lake Union Streetcar. It has since been expanded to include a second line, the First Hill Streetcar, which will be extended downtown to connect the two lines.

Legacy
 In 1973, Seattle Transit was absorbed by the Municipality of Metropolitan Seattle (which later was replaced by King County Metro).
 After selling its streetcar lines, PSTP&L eventually became Puget Sound Energy.

See also
Highland Park and Lake Burien Railway

References

Further reading

External links
 
 

Railway lines opened in 1884
Railway lines closed in 1941
Streetcars in Washington (state)
Transportation in Seattle
1884 establishments in Washington Territory